Urlings is a town located in the southern part of Saint Mary Parish on the island of Antigua in Antigua and Barbuda.

Urlings is one of the 6 towns in Antigua and Barbuda that has switched to digital television.

Culture

Society & Local Government 
Urlings has no village council or other type of local government. Urlings is located within district C, with Urlings Primary School being the main counting centre of Saint Mary's South, which is often dominated by the United Progressive Party. Urlings has a local community association which often interacts with the government to represent the issues in the community. The association has a president, Genevieve Tonge. The association also holds community town halls.

Demographics 
Urlings has four enumeration districts.

 81300 Urlings-StMarysChurch
 81400 Urlings-Central
 81500 Urlings-West
 81600 UrlingsSchool

Census Data

Transportation 
Orange Valley Heliport is located near the town.

Climate

References

Populated places in Antigua and Barbuda
Saint Mary Parish, Antigua and Barbuda
Urlings